At least three ships of the Pakistan Navy have been named PNS Zulfiqar (sometimes romanised as Zulfiquar). They are named after Zulfiqar, the legendary sword of Ali, the fourth Muslim Caliph.

 , ex HMS Deveron, ex HMIS Dhanush, a 
 PNS Zulfiqar (F262), ex ,'' a batch 3B broadbeam 
 , a F-22P 

Pakistan Navy ship names